The sport of football in the country of Mozambique is run by the Mozambican Football Federation. The association administers the national football team, as well as the national league. Football is the most popular sport in the country.

History

Since the arrival of Vasco da Gama in 1498, the Portuguese increasingly strengthened their presence in the country until Mozambique's independence from Portugal in 1975, when the country became a Portuguese colony. To this day, therefore, football in Mozambique is characterized by its Portuguese origins and relationships, for example by partly former, partly still current affiliate associations of the Portuguese clubs Sporting Lisbon and Benfica. Also, many Mozambican footballers play in Portugal. The most famous example might be Eusébio. He began his footballing career in 1957 at Clube de Desportos do Maxaquene, which was founded on May 20, 1920 in the capital of Mozambique as Sporting Lisbon's sixth branch club. From 1960 Eusébio then played for Benfica, where he was eleven times Portuguese champion and 1962 European Champions Cup (now the UEFA Champions League) won. He became European Footballer of the Year in 1965 and was the top scorer of the 1966 World Cup.

Already since 1922 regular championships in Mozambique were played out, at first only as a district championship of Lourenço Marques (today Maputo), from 1956 as the national championship of the Portuguese overseas province of Mozambique.

In 1975, Mozambique became independent from Portugal, and in 1976 the National Football Association of the Republic of Mozambique, the Mozambican Football Federation was founded. Since then, FMF has been directing football leagues in the country and is responsible for the national football teams.

Domestic football

Since 1976, FMF has organized the country's top division, the Campeonato Moçambicano de Futebol, better known as Moçambola. Record champions are each with nine titles founded in 1924 Clube Ferroviário de Maputo and existing since 1955 CD Costa do Sol. In 2014, for the fourth time in five years, the league Muçulmana became national champion.

The moçambola's three last-placed clubs are relegated to the second division, the single-track Segunda Divisão with 21 clubs. Under this second league follow the eleven supreme leagues of the football associations of the eleven Mozambican provinces.

The national trophy of the FMF, the Taça de Moçambique, has been played since 1978. The first winner was CD Maxaquene, who won the cup nine times (as of December 2014). However, the CD Costa do Sol is also in the cup competition record champion, with 11 won trophies. In 2013 and 2014, the Clube Ferroviário da Beira won the trophy.

Mozambique clubs have often played in the CAF Champions League and the African Cup Winners' Cup. So far, however, none of the clubs could win a title there (as of January 2015)

National team

The Mozambican national football team has participated in FIFA tournaments since the 1980 FIFA World Cup  finals. So far they have not qualified for a World Cup.

Mozambique has already participated in the Africa Cup of Nations four times, in 1986, 1996, 1998 and 2010. They were eliminated in all four tournaments in the preliminary round.

For the African Nations Championships Mozambique could qualify in 2014 for the first time, but retired there in the preliminary round.

At the Nations Cup of Southern Africa, the COSAFA Cup, Mozambique participated in each edition so far. The best placement reached his selection thereby with the second place in the year 2009 (conditions: 2014).

Mozambique also took part in every edition of the football tournaments in the framework of the Jogos da Lusofonia, the "Lusophony Games". In 2017, it will host the games itself.

In December 2014, Mozambique finished 98th in the FIFA World Ranking. The highest FIFA placement reached by the national team in November 1997 with the 66th place, the worst in July 2005 with the 134th place.

Women's football

The women's Mozambique national football team took part in the first Africa Women Cup of Nations  in 1998, but dropped out in the preliminary round. Since then, the selection of Mozambique has not survived a qualifying round and therefore could not participate in any other African Championship (as of 2014).

In December 2014, Mozambique finished 133rd in the FIFA Women's World Ranking.

Felice Lemos caused quite a stir in 2013. She was known as the first female coach of a male football team, when she took over the first team of the club Zixaxa in the capital Maputo. She reported a lot of encouragement from the players and the fans, but she also experienced misogynist discrimination on the part of her coaches colleagues.

League system

Football stadiums in Mozambique

References